The Schleswig Regiment of Foot is a Royal Danish Army infantry regiment. On 1 January 2001 the regiment was merged with the Queen's Life Regiment, into the Prince's Life Regiment. In 2018 it was announced that the regiment would be reestablished on 1 January 2019, as a light infantry battalion.

History
The Schleswig Regiment of Foot can trace its history back to 1778 when it was raised from personnel from existing Regiments. Until 1842 it was garrisoned in Schleswig, until 1854 in Fredericia, until 1923 in Copenhagen and thereafter in Haderslev. From 1960's to 1997 the regiment only had infantry battalions, in 1997 it was upgraded with one mechanised infantry battalion.

The Regiment participated in the Napoleonic Wars (first as part of the Danish mobile auxiliary force, commanded by Prince Frederik of Hesse and under supreme command of Marechal L.N. Davout, and then as part of the Allied Forces against Napoleon under supreme command of Wellington), First Schleswig War (1848–1850) and Second Schleswig War (1864). The regimental flag has the battle honours Boden 1813 and Isted 1850. The fighting at Boden occurred near Oldesloe in Holstein in early December, less than a week before the 1813 Battle of Bornhöved. Since 26 March 1949 the flag carried the name Slesvigske Fodregiment.

On 1 November 1991 the Funen Life Regiment and the King's Jutlandic Regiment of Foot were merged into the regiment. In 2000 the regiment, with all battalions, was merged into the Prince's Life Regiment.

In 2019, the regiment was revived along with Danish Artillery Regiment. then the regiment was revived it contained of:
One Battalion of the line (13th(XIII/SLFR)) and one reserve battalion (22th(XXII/SLFR)) they were reactivated whit historical numbers, If the regiment will expand the battalion numbers will most likly be, 18th(XVIII/SLFR) and 3rd(III/SLFR)

Organisation
The regiment itself has one active battalion, one reserve battalion and a Musical Corps: 
  13th Battalion (XIII/SLFR), historical number, reactivated in 2019 as a Light Infantry Battalion
  Staff Company
  1st Light Infantry company
  2nd Light Infantry company
  3rd Light Infantry company (inactive)
  4th Basic Training company
 22nd Battalion (XXII/SLFR) historical number, reactivated in 2019 as a battalion for reservists (no companies attach)
  Schleswig Musical Corps

Disband units 
  1st battalion (I/SLFR), Founded 1961, Disband 2000. Motorized Infantry Battalion (from 1997 to 2000 Mechanized Infantry).
  2nd battalion (II/SLFR), Founded 1961, Disband 2000. Infantry Battalion.
  3rd battalion (III/SLFR), Founded 1961, Disband 2000. Infantry Battalion.(the number "3rd battalion" is used by the soldiers-association of the regiment)         
  4th battalion (IV/SLFR), merge in from Funen Life Regiment in 1991, Disband 2000. Motorized Infantry Battalion.
  3rd Brigade Staff Company/3rd Jutland Brigade, Founded 1961, Disband 2000.

Names of the regiment

Standards

References

Further reading
 Lærebog for Hærens Menige, Hærkommandoen, marts 1960
 "Slesvigske Fodregiment - i krig og fred", Niels Friis 1953

Danish Army regiments
Military units and formations established in 1778
Military units and formations disestablished in 2001
Military units and formations established in 2019
History of Schleswig-Holstein
1770s establishments in Denmark